Clear cell papillary renal cell carcinoma (CCPRCC) is a rare subtype of renal cell carcinoma (RCC) that has microscopic morphologic features of papillary renal cell carcinoma and clear cell renal cell carcinoma, yet is pathologically distinct based on molecular changes and immunohistochemistry.

Pathology
CCPRCC classically has apical nuclei, i.e. the nucleus is adjacent to the luminal aspect.
In most glandular structures the nuclei are usually basally located, i.e. in the cytoplasm adjacent to the basement membrane.

They typically stain with CK7 and do not stain with TFE3 and AMACR.

See also
 Renal cancer
 Renal cell carcinoma

References

Kidney cancer